Cristo Jesús Romero Gómez (born 30 April 2000), simply known as Cristo, is a Spanish footballer who plays for CF Intercity as a left back.

Club career
Cristo was born in Algeciras, Cádiz, Andalusia, and represented Málaga CF as a youth. He made his senior debut with the reserves on 25 August 2019, starting in a 4–0 Tercera División away routing of Alhaurín de la Torre CF.

Cristo made his first team debut on 12 October 2019, starting in a 1–2 home loss against Cádiz CF in the Segunda División championship. The following 17 August, he renewed his contract until 2023.

On 8 August 2021, Cristo moved to Real Sociedad on a one-year loan deal, with a buyout clause. Initially assigned to the reserves also in the second division, he made his first team debut for the Txuri-urdin on 16 September by coming on as a late substitute for Joseba Zaldúa in a 2–2 away draw against PSV Eindhoven, for the season's UEFA Europa League.

References

External links
 
 
 

2000 births
Living people
Footballers from Algeciras
Spanish footballers
Association football defenders
La Liga players
Segunda División players
Tercera División players
Atlético Malagueño players
Málaga CF players
Real Sociedad B footballers
Real Sociedad footballers
CF Intercity players